Max-Eyth-See is a lake at Stuttgart-Hofen in Baden-Württemberg, Germany. It was created in 1935 by reclaiming a former quarry and is now an official nature reserve. At an elevation of 214 m, its surface area is approximately 17.3 ha.

External links

Lakes of Baden-Württemberg
LMaxEythSee